FIRA may refer to:

Persons
Fira Basuki (born 1972), Indonesian novelist

Places
 Fira, the modern capital of the Greek Aegean island, Santorini
 Fira de Barcelona, the Barcelona (Spain) Trade Show institution
 Fira station of the Barcelona Metro

Science
 FiRa Consortium, the Fine Ranging Consortium is an industry consortium working to further interoperable Ultra-Wideband (UWB) technology.
 Fira OS, a Linux-based mobile operating system and software platform developed by Fira

Abbreviations
 Federation of Indian Rationalist Associations, an umbrella body of rationalist, atheist, skeptic, secularist and science organizations in India
 Federation of International Robot-soccer Association, an international organization which organizes competitive soccer competitions between autonomous robots
 Foreign Investment Review Agency, a Canadian organization
 Furniture Industry Research Association, a United Kingdom research association which serves the furniture industry
 FIRA – Association of European Rugby, now Rugby Europe, the administrative body for rugby union in Europe
 UDP-3-O-(3-hydroxymyristoyl)glucosamine N-acyltransferase, an enzyme

See also
 Fira Sans, a sans-serif typeface